Correct is an unincorporated community in Johnson Township, Ripley County, in the U.S. state of Indiana.

History
A post office called Correct was established in 1881, and remained in operation until it was discontinued in 1905. According to tradition, the name of the village was supposed to be Comet, but postal authorities mistakingly entered the name as Correct, and that name stuck.

Geography

References

Unincorporated communities in Ripley County, Indiana
Unincorporated communities in Indiana